Hemidactylus alkiyumii is a species of house gecko from Oman.

References

Further reading
 Maia, João P., D. James Harris, and Salvador Carranza. "Reconstruction of the evolutionary history of Haemosporida (Apicomplexa) based on the cyt b gene with characterization of Haemocystidium in geckos (Squamata: Gekkota) from Oman." Parasitology International 65.1 (2016): 5–11.

External links
 Reptile Database
 

Hemidactylus
Reptiles of the Middle East
Reptiles described in 2012